Osmariel Maholi Villalobos Atencio (born August 2, 1988)  is a Venezuelan TV show host, model and beauty pageant titleholder who was crowned Miss Earth Venezuela in 2011. She represented Venezuela in Miss Earth 2012 in the Philippines and won the "Miss Earth-Water" (2nd runner up) title and Miss Photogenic Awards, gathering 28,000 votes combined through social media and the Miss Earth website.

Villalobos was employed by Venevision (Portada's  TV program).

References

External links
Miss Venezuela Official Website

1988 births
Living people
Venezuelan female models
Miss Earth 2012 contestants